William Henry Steers (April 13, 1897 – December 20, 1957) was an American football player and coach. He served as the head football coach at California University of Pennsylvania in California, Pennsylvania from 1929 to 1940.

References

1897 births
1957 deaths
Oregon Ducks football players
California Vulcans football coaches